Atsadawut Luengsuntorn born September 26, 1972. He is a Thai actor. In present, he has television drama producer.

Biography
He was born in September 26, 1972 in the Phatthalung Province. He has Num Preaw in 1992 and then, he started a career in modelling. Then, in 1992, played a coffee mate with Sonia Couling. He has play thai television drama in Bun lang Meck in 1993. Currently, He has He is a radio presenter at 89 Chill FM and television drama producer. In his life. He married with Panit Jianwibulyanont. he have a daughter. her named Singh Luengsuntorn

Filmography

Film
 The Tiger Blade (2004) as Yosthana
 Madagascar (2005) voiced as Alex (Thai Dubbed)
 Madagascar: Escape 2 Africa (2007) voiced as Alex (Thai Dubbed)
 Speed Racer (2009) voiced as Racer X (Thai Dubbed)
 Madagascar 3: Uroupe's Most Wanted (2015) voiced as Alex (Thai Dubbed)

Television drama (as actor)

Television Drama (as producer)

TV Host 
 Ban Noy Soy Gao aired on MCOT HD (Currently discontinued)
 Super Concert aired on Channel 3 with Paornrat Yodnen (Currently discontinued)
 Fancy Done aired on Channel 5 with Pornchita Na Songkla (Currently discontinued)
 School Bus aired on Channel 5 (At present, change the new MC)
 DJ.Chill FM 89 AtimeMedia (Currently discontinued)
 Wetee Thai aired on Channel 5 with Itsariya Saisanan (Currently discontinued)

Stage 
 T.Y. family (1992)
 Inao-Choraka (1994)
 Ngoh Pa (1995)
 Amadius (1996)
 The Little Prince (1997)
 Dao Lao Nitan (1997)
 Phoo Ying Plastic (1998–2002)
 Mahajanaka (2007)

Music Video 
 Mai Mee Weaw – Itthi Palangkul (1992)
 Krai Kon Nan – Polpol X Labanoon
 Thorn Tua – Num Sek
 Roo Mai Tam Mai – Maleewan Jemina

References

External links
 
 
 

1972 births
Living people
Atsadawut Luengsuntorn
Atsadawut Luengsuntorn
Atsadawut Luengsuntorn
Atsadawut Luengsuntorn